Mixmag is a British electronic dance and clubbing magazine published in London. Launched in 1983 as a print magazine, it has branched into dance events, including festivals and club nights.

History
The first issue of Mixmag was printed on 1 February 1983 as a 16-page black-and-white magazine published by Disco Mix Club, a DJ mailout service. The first cover featured American music group Shalamar.

When house music began in the 1980s, editor and DJ Dave Seaman turned the magazine from a newsletter for DJs into a magazine covering all dance music and club culture. Mixmag, in association with its original publishing company, DMC Publishing, released a series of CDs under the "Mixmag Live" heading. The magazine, which reached a circulation of up to 70,000 copies, was later sold to EMAP Ltd. in the mid-1990s.

In 1996, an American version titled Mixmag USA was launched. It was renamed Mixer after the UK edition of Mixmag was sold to EMAP. It ceased publication altogether in 2003.

After a fall in sales in 2003, Mixmag was acquired by Development Hell, in 2005. In 2007, Nick DeCosemo became editor. Duncan Dick became editor in April 2015. In 2012, The Guardian collaborated with Mixmag on a survey of British drug-taking habits.

The magazine paused its print edition during the COVID-19 pandemic.

Mixmag is owned by Wasted Talent Ltd, a company which changed its name from Mixmag Media Ltd in May 2017.

References

External links

 

1983 establishments in the United Kingdom
Bi-monthly magazines published in the United Kingdom
Monthly magazines published in the United Kingdom
Music magazines published in the United Kingdom
Dance music magazines
Dance music magazines published in England
English-language magazines
Magazines published in London
Magazines established in 1983
Media and communications in the London Borough of Islington